"Ganbareh" is a song by German production group Sash! It was released on June 24, 2002, via Virgin Records as the first single from their fourth studio album S4!Sash!.

Overview
The song is performed by Mikio. The song was a notable hit in Europe and reached the 43rd position in German and Australian charts. "Ganbare" (頑張れ) means "go for it" in Japanese. The song was originally written for the official FIFA World Cup 2002 album as South Korea and Japan hosted the event. The song did not make it there, but was used for the official ice hockey world cup. The single also includes a bonus track, "The Sunset", performed by Georgina Collins.

Track listing

Credits
Artwork – Virgin Munich
Cover photography – Adrian Raba, Hagen Brede Productions GmbH
Producer – Sash!, Tokapi
Vocals – Mikio (tracks: 1, 3 to 5)
Writers – Ralf Kappmeier, Sascha Lappessen, Thomas Alisson

Charts

References

External links

2002 singles
2002 songs
Virgin Records singles
Sash! songs